I See It Now is the third studio album by American country music artist Tracy Lawrence. Released in 1994 on Atlantic Records, the album produced four singles: the title track, "If the World Had a Front Porch", "Texas Tornado", and "As Any Fool Can See". Of these, "Texas Tornado" was a number-one song on the Hot Country Songs chart, while the other singles all reached number two on the same chart. "Hillbilly with a Heartache", a duet with John Anderson, can also be found on Anderson's 1994 album Country 'til I Die. "I Got a Feelin'" was co-written by Joe Diffie, who would later record it for his 1997 album Twice Upon a Time.

Track listing

Personnel
As listed in liner notes.
John Anderson – duet vocals (5)
Eddie Bayers – drums (1-6, 8-10)
Dennis Burnside – piano (4-6)
Larry Byrom – acoustic guitar (1-3, 7-10)
Kimberly Fleming – background vocals (7)
Paul Franklin – Dobro, steel guitar, Pedabro (1-3, 7-10)
Sonny Garrish – steel guitar (4-6)
Vickie Hampton – background vocals (7)
Dann Huff – electric guitar (1-3, 7-10) 
Tracy Lawrence – lead vocals (all tracks)
Chris Leuzinger – electric guitar (5)
Donna McElroy – background vocals (7)
Terry McMillan – harmonica, percussion (all tracks)
Steve Nathan – piano, keyboards (1-3, 7-10)
Brent Rowan – acoustic and electric guitars (4, 6)
Joe Spivey – fiddle (1-3, 6-10), Ace guitar (4), acoustic guitar (5)
James Stroud – drums (7)
Dennis Wilson – background vocals (1-6, 8-10)
Willie Weeks – bass guitar (4-6)
Glenn Worf – bass guitar (1-3, 7-10)
Curtis Young – background vocals (1-6, 8-10)

Production credits
Tracks 1-3, 7-10 - James Stroud
Track 4 - Tracy Lawrence
Track 5 - Tracy Lawrence, Flip Anderson, James Stroud
Track 6 - Tracy Lawrence, Flip Anderson

Charts

Weekly charts

Year-end charts

Certifications

References

1994 albums
Tracy Lawrence albums
Albums produced by James Stroud
Atlantic Records albums